Bruce Johnstone (born September 1, 1943) is a New Zealand-American jazz baritone saxophonist. He also plays alto saxophone, bass clarinet, and flute

Career 
Born in Wellington, New Zealand, Johnstone was a member of Maynard Ferguson's band from 1972 to 1976, after having played in Denmark with Ben Webster and Dexter Gordon, and in London with Stan Kenton.

He regularly featured in Down Beat magazine's Readers' Poll behind Gerry Mulligan and Pepper Adams. In the mid-1970s, he was a founding member of the jazz-funk band New York Mary. In 1977, he joined the Woody Herman Band and toured and recorded with the band until April 1978. He taught at the State University of New York at Fredonia as the director of jazz studies for 15 years until 2016. During his last year at Fredonia performed in concert with trumpet player Arturo Sandoval. He has been a regularly scheduled player with the Buffalo Philharmonic Orchestra's jazz concerts for the past 20 years and has appeared on several of the orchestra's Grammy winning recordings. He has also been a featured soloist on Ken Poston's big band tribute concerts in Los Angeles.

Personal life 
Johnstone became an American citizen in 2003 and lives in Ripley, New York.

Discography

As leader/co-leader
 1976: New York Mary (Arista/Freedom)
 1976: A Piece of the Apple (Arista/Freedom)

As sideman
With Maynard Ferguson
 1973: M. F. Horn 3 (Columbia)
 1974: Chameleon (Columbia)
 1974: M. F. Horn 4 & 5: Live at Jimmy's

With Woody Herman
 1978: Road Father (Century)
 1978: Chick, Donald, Walter & Woodrow (Century)

With others
 1975: Night Life – Luther Allison 
 1976: Creative Orchestra Music 1976 – Anthony Braxton

References

External links
Biography at SUNY Fredonia

1943 births
Living people
Jazz baritone saxophonists
People from Wellington City
21st-century saxophonists
People from Ripley, New York